Marty L. Miller Field is a baseball venue in Norfolk, Virginia, United States. It is home to the Norfolk State Spartans baseball team of the NCAA Division I Northeast Conference. The venue is named for former Norfolk State baseball coach Marty Miller. Built in 1997, it has a capacity of 1,500 spectators.

Naming 
Following its 1997 construction, Miller Field was dedicated to Marty L. Miller, who coached the Norfolk State baseball program from 1973 to 2004. Miller, who also served as athletic director, had a career record of 718-543-3.

Features 
The playing field itself features a natural grass surface, gravel warning track, drainage system, bullpens, and stadium lighting. The venue also has bleacher seating, an electronic scoreboard, and a press box.

Events 
The venue hosted the 2006, 2007, 2008, and 2012 Mid-Eastern Athletic Conference baseball tournaments, all won by Bethune-Cookman.

See also
 List of NCAA Division I baseball venues

References

College baseball venues in the United States
Norfolk State Spartans baseball
Sports venues in Norfolk, Virginia
Baseball venues in Virginia
1997 establishments in Virginia
Sports venues completed in 1997